In computer software, horizontal market software is a type of application software that is useful in a wide range of industries. This is the opposite of vertical market software, which has a scope of usefulness limited to few industries. Horizontal market software is also known as "productivity software." Examples of horizontal market software include word processors, web browsers, spreadsheets, calendars, project management applications, and generic bookkeeping applications. Since horizontal market software is developed to be used by a broad audience, it generally lacks any market-specific customizations.

See also 
Horizontal market
Vertical market software
Vertical market
Product software implementation method
Enterprise resource planning

References

Software by type
Software